Ibrahima Baldé (born 17 January 2003) is a French professional footballer who plays as a forward for  club Annecy, on loan from Lens.

Career
A youth product of Montmartre SPO, and Red Star, Baldé joined the youth academy of Lens in 2018. He signed his first professional contract with the club on 1 July 2021. He made his professional debut with Lens in a 4–0 Ligue 1 loss to Brest on 21 November 2021, coming on as a late sub in the 73rd minute.

On 11 August 2022, Baldé joined Annecy in Ligue 2 on loan.

Personal life
Born in France, Baldé is of Guinean descent. He is the brother of the retired footballer Abdoulaye Baldé.

References

External links
 
 FFF Profile

2003 births
Living people
French sportspeople of Guinean descent
Black French sportspeople
French footballers
Footballers from Paris
Association football forwards
France youth international footballers
Ligue 1 players
Ligue 2 players
Championnat National 2 players
RC Lens players
FC Annecy players